The Province or  De Provincie  is a 1991 Dutch drama film directed by Jan Bosdriesz.

Cast
Thom Hoffman (Frank)
Pierre Bokma (Peter)
Gijs Scholten van Aschat (Koos)
Tamar van den Dop (Lili)
Peter Oosthoek (Father of Frank)
Gerard Thoolen (Sartorius)
Gusta Gerritsen (Jenny)
Camilla Braaksma (Nathalie)
Els Ingeborg Smits (Mother of Frank)
Rudolf Lucieer (Psychiatrist)
Joss Flühr (Mrs. van Strijen)
Rifka Lodeizen (Girl, working at bank)
[Eva Thornton] (Young Emily)

External links 
 

Dutch drama films
1991 films
1990s Dutch-language films
1991 drama films